John O'Leary is a former Grey Cup champion running back who played three seasons for the Montreal Alouettes of the Canadian Football League, winning a Grey Cup Championship.

Coming from football powerhouse the University of Nebraska, O'Leary had three successful seasons with the Alouettes, rushing for 2,023 yards and catching another 1,217 yards, and scoring 17 touchdowns.

External links
CFLAPEDIA BIO
FANBASE BIO
COLLEGE STATS

1954 births
Nebraska Cornhuskers football players
American players of Canadian football
Living people
Montreal Alouettes players
Canadian football running backs
Players of American football from New York (state)
People from Port Washington, New York